Wuling Town was a historic town of Dingcheng District (the former Changde County) in Changde Prefecture-level City, Hunan, China. It was established on March 12, 1981, named after Wuling of local ancient name; Guojiapu Township was merge to the town. As a township-level division, Wuling Town ceased to be a separate town, It was divided into 3 subdistricts of Guojiapu, Hongyun and Yuxia in 2013.

Wuling Town was located on the southern bank of the Yuan River, It was surrounded by Wuling District across the Yuan river to the west, north and east, Doumuhu Town to the south.

Communities and villages

References

Dingcheng District
Former township-level divisions of Hunan